Vernon Carver Rudolph (June 30, 1915 – August 16, 1973) was an American businessman who founded Krispy Kreme Doughnuts, Inc.

Biography

Early life
Vernon Carver Rudolph was born in Marshall County, Kentucky. He was the oldest of four children born to Plumie and Rethie Rudolph. His siblings included Lewis Rudolph, who would later help found Krispy Kreme. As he grew older, Vernon Rudolph began to help in the general store that his uncle owned.

Career
When he graduated high school, he went to Paducah, Kentucky with his uncle. In 1933, Rudolph's uncle bought a doughnut shop and recipe for yeast-raised donuts from a French federal employee and chef named Joe LeBeau. This all occurred during the middle of the Great Depression, so they moved to Nashville, Tennessee to see if they could get better business there and secure their financial future. Things did not work out for them in Nashville, so they moved back to Kentucky where Rudolph's uncle sold his business to his brother, Rudolph's father. His son, Lewis, started working for the shop. In 1936. his father opened another shop in Charleston, West Virginia and a few years later, a third shop in Atlanta, Georgia.

In the summer of 1937, determined to own his own Krispy Kreme shop, Rudolph decided to move to Winston-Salem, North Carolina, home to the R. J. Reynolds Tobacco Company, as he was smoking a Camel cigarette. He rented a building across from Salem College and Academy, and on July 13, 1937, using the original Krispy Kreme recipe, opened his shop. His first customers were local grocery stores, but people began to stop by the store asking if they could buy hot doughnuts. In the 1940s, he sold franchises and in 1947, he founded the Krispy Kreme Corporation, becoming Chairman and President.

Personal life
In 1939, he married Ruth Ayers, who was from Atlanta, Georgia. They adopted a baby girl, Patricia Ann, in 1943. In 1944, his wife died in a car accident in Orangeburg, South Carolina. In 1946, he got married again, to Lorraine Flynt of Winston-Salem, NC. They had four children, Vernon Carver Jr., Sanford, Curtis, and Beverly.

Death
Rudolph died on August 17, 1973, in Winston-Salem, North Carolina at the age of 58.

References

1915 births
1973 deaths
American chief executives of food industry companies
American food company founders
Businesspeople from Kentucky
Fast-food chain founders
People from Marshall County, Kentucky
People from Nashville, Tennessee
People from Winston-Salem, North Carolina
20th-century American businesspeople